Homona polystriana is a species of moth of the family Tortricidae. It is found in Vietnam.

The wingspan is about 23 mm. The forewings are cream with small brownish admixture and a pinkish hue. The strigulation (fine streaks) and lines are dark brown. The hindwings are grey, but cream orange in the apical area.

Etymology
The species name refers to the markings of the forewings and is derived from Greek poly- (meaning numerous) and Latin striana (meaning striated).

References

Moths described in 2008
Homona (moth)